"Stan of Arabia" may refer to two episodes from the American animated comedy series American Dad!:
"Stan of Arabia: Part 1", fifth episode of the second season that aired November 6, 2005
"Stan of Arabia: Part 2", sixth episode of the second season that aired November 13, 2005